Damatou Subdistrict is a subdistrict and the seat of Ziyang District in Yiyang Prefecture-level City, Hunan, China. The subdistrict was reformed through the amalgamation of Dashuiping Subdistrict and the former Damatou Subdistrict in 2005.

References

Ziyang District
Subdistricts of Hunan
County seats in Hunan